Maryland Route 62 (MD 62) is a state highway in the U.S. state of Maryland.  Known for most of its length as Little Antietam Road, the state highway runs  from MD 804 in Chewsville north to MD 60 in Leitersburg in northeastern Washington County.  MD 62 was constructed in two sections in the mid 1910s and the early 1930s.

Route description

MD 62 begins at an intersection with unsigned MD 804 in Chewsville.  MD 804, the old alignment of MD 64 (Jefferson Boulevard), heads southwest as Trackside Drive to an intersection with MD 64 and east as Twin Springs Drive through the center of Chewsville.  MD 62 heads west as two-lane undivided Twin Springs Drive and immediately crosses CSX's Hanover Subdivision railroad line.  The state highway heads west until it reaches Little Antietam Road, onto which the state highway turns northeast.  MD 62 passes through a mix of farmland, forest, and scattered residences and veers north at Old Forge Road.  The state highway passes the Good-Hartle Farm just before crossing Little Antietam Creek a short distance east of its confluence with Antietam Creek.  MD 62 continues to its northern terminus at MD 60 (Leitersburg Pike) just west of Leitersburg.

History
The first section of MD 62 was paved from Chewsville to Old Forge Road in 1916.  The remainder of the highway to Leitersburg was built in 1933.  MD 62 originally met MD 64 at its southern terminus.  After MD 64 bypassed Chewsville in 1956, the old alignment of MD 64 was designated MD 804B.

Junction list

See also

References

External links

MDRoads: MD 62

062
Maryland Route 062